A Christmas Carol is a 2009 American computer-animated Christmas fantasy film written and directed by Robert Zemeckis, produced by ImageMovers Digital and released by Walt Disney Pictures. Based on Charles Dickens's 1843 novel of the same name, the film was animated through the process of motion capture, a technique used in Zemeckis's previous films The Polar Express (2004) and Beowulf (2007), and stars the voices of Jim Carrey, Gary Oldman, Colin Firth, Bob Hoskins, Robin Wright Penn and Cary Elwes. It is Disney's third adaptation of the novel, following Mickey's Christmas Carol (1983) and The Muppet Christmas Carol (1992), and the first of two films produced by ImageMovers Digital. 

A Christmas Carol was officially released in Disney Digital 3D, RealD 3D, and IMAX 3D on November 6, 2009. Its world premiere in London coincided with the switching-on of the annual Oxford Street and Regent Street Christmas lights. The film grossed $325 million on a $175–200 million budget and received mixed reviews from critics, who praised its visuals, Alan Silvestri's musical score and the performances of Carrey and Oldman, but criticized its dark tone. Due to the film's unsatisfactory box office performance, ImageMovers Digital was shut down by Disney after the release of its next film, Mars Needs Moms (2011), and re-absorbed into ImageMovers.

Plot 

On Christmas Eve 1843, in London, miserly businessman Ebenezer Scrooge  refuses to partake in the merriment of Christmas, declining his nephew Fred's invitation to an annual Christmas dinner party and refusing to make a donation to the poor. His employee, Bob Cratchit, asks Scrooge to give him a day off on Christmas Day to spend time with his family, to which Scrooge reluctantly agrees. Returning home that night, Scrooge encounters the ghost of Jacob Marley, his business partner who died seven years earlier, bound in heavy chains. Marley warns Scrooge to change his wicked ways or be condemned to a worse fate. Before leaving, Marley informs Scrooge that he will be haunted by three spirits over three nights.

Scrooge is visited by the Ghost of Christmas Past, who takes him back in time and makes him relive his lonely childhood in a boarding school. The spirit then shows his beloved younger sister Fan, Fred's future mother, and how he became an employee under Fezziwig, and became engaged to a woman named Belle, who left him after he developed his obsession with wealth. Overwhelmed, Scrooge extinguishes the spirit with his candle snuffer cap and is rocketed back to his house.

Scrooge meets the Ghost of Christmas Present, who shows him the joys of Christmas. Scrooge and the Ghost visit Bob's house, learning that his family is content with their small dinner, and Scrooge starts to take pity on Bob's ill son Tiny Tim, whom the Ghost comments will likely not survive until next Christmas. The Ghost slowly begins to age as they next visit Fred's Christmas party, where Fred insists that they raise a toast to Scrooge in spite of his cold demeanor. Arriving in Big Ben, the Ghost warns Scrooge the evils of "Ignorance" and "Want" before dying when Big Ben begins tolling midnight. "Ignorance" and "Want" manifest themselves before Scrooge as two wretched children who grow into violent, insane individuals, leaving the spirit laughing as he withers away.

The Ghost of Christmas Yet to Come then arrives, appearing as a dark shadow, and takes Scrooge into the future. He witnesses a group of businessmen discussing an unnamed colleague's death, saying they would only attend the funeral if lunch is provided. After being chased across London by the Ghost riding a hearse, Scrooge recognizes his charwoman Mrs. Dilber selling the stolen possessions of the deceased. Shortly after, Scrooge sees the aforementioned colleague's body on a bed, but is too anxious to see his identity. Scrooge then asks to see emotion connected to the death, and is shown a family who is relieved that he is dead, as they now have more time to pay off their debt. When Scrooge asks to see tenderness connected to death, he is shown the Cratchit family, who are in mourning over the passing of Tiny Tim. Scrooge is then escorted to a cemetery, where the Ghost points out the man’s neglected grave, revealing Scrooge as the man who died. Devastated, Scrooge promises to change his ways - he is horrified to discover that if he doesn't change, he is destined to die the next morning. The Ghost causes him to fall into his empty coffin above Hell, but before he strikes the coffin, he finds himself back in his own room.

Learning it is Christmas Day, Scrooge gleefully sends Bob's family a turkey dinner while anonymous, ventures out with the charity workers and the citizens of London to spread cheer in the city, and later attends Fred's Christmas dinner, where he is warmly welcomed. The following day, he gives Bob a raise. As Scrooge celebrates, Bob addresses the audience how Scrooge became a father figure to Tiny Tim, who escapes death, and that Scrooge now treats everyone with kindness, generosity, and compassion, thus embodying the spirit of Christmas.

Cast 

 Jim Carrey as Ebenezer Scrooge, a stingy, grouchy, and selfish old man whose sheer miserly nature leads him to despise Christmas and all things which engender happiness.
 Carrey also portrays other roles in the film including:
 Ghost of Christmas Past, the first spirit to visit Scrooge. He is depicted as an androgynous man with a flickering flame for a head and a body like a candle and speaks with an Irish accent.
 Ghost of Christmas Present, the second spirit to visit Scrooge. He is depicted as a towering man with red hair, a full beard, and a green ermine robe, and he is a jolly figure prone to hearty laughter and speaks with a Yorkshire accent.
 Ghost of Christmas Yet to Come, the third spirit to visit Scrooge. He is depicted as an ominous shadow of a figure in a large black hooded cloak and he does not speak.
 Gary Oldman as:
 Bob Cratchit, Scrooge's cheerful assistant and underpaid clerk.
 Jacob Marley, the ghost of Scrooge's former business partner who is bound in chains.
 Oldman also provides the motion capture for Tiny Tim, Cratchit's youngest son.
 Colin Firth as Fred, Scrooge's cheerful nephew and only living relative. He is the son of Scrooge's younger sister Fan.
 Bob Hoskins as Mr. Nigel Fezziwig, the proprietor of a warehouse business for whom Scrooge worked as a young apprentice.
 Hoskins also portrays Old Joe, a fence who buys the belongings of the deceased Scrooge from Mrs. Jill Dilber.
 Robin Wright Penn as:
 Fan, Scrooge's beloved younger sister who has since died.
 Belle, Scrooge's neglected fiancée.
 Cary Elwes as Portly Gentleman #1/Dick Wilkins/Mad Fiddler/Guest #2/Business Man #1
 Elwes would also act as a stand-in for Scrooge or the Ghosts of Christmas Past and Present in scenes where these characters appear together, as all were portrayed by Jim Carrey.
 Fionnula Flanagan as Mrs. Jill Dilber, Scrooge's charwoman.
 Steve Valentine as Funerary Undertaker/Topper
 Daryl Sabara as Undertaker's Apprentice/Tattered Caroler #1/Beggar Boy #1/Peter Cratchit/Well-Dressed Caroler #1
 Sage Ryan as Tattered Caroler #2
 Amber Gainey Meade as Tattered Caroler #3/ Well-Dressed Caroler #2
 Ryan Ochoa as Tattered Caroler #4/Beggar Boy #2/Young Cratchit Boy/Ignorance Boy/Young Boy with Sleigh
 Bobbi Page as Tattered Caroler #5/Well-Dressed Caroler #3
 Ron Bottitta as Tattered Caroler #6/Well-Dressed Caroler #4
 Sammi Hanratty as Beggar Boy #3/Young Cratchit Girl/Want Girl
 Julian Holloway as Fat Cook/Portly Gentleman #2/Business Man #3
 Jacquie Barnbrook as Mrs. Allie Fezziwig/Fred's sister-in-law/Well-Dressed Caroler #5
 Lesley Manville as Mrs. Emily Cratchit
 Molly C. Quinn as Belinda Cratchit
 Fay Masterson as Martha Cratchit/Guest #1/Caroline
 Leslie Zemeckis as Janet Holywell, Fred's wife.
 Paul Blackthorne as Guest #3/Business Man #2
 Michael Hyland as Guest #4
 Kerry Hoyt as Adult Ignorance
 Julene Renee-Preciado as Adult Want

Production 
After making The Polar Express (2004), Robert Zemeckis stated that he "fell in love with digital theater" and tried finding an avenue in order to use the format again. He eventually decided that an adaptation of Charles Dickens's A Christmas Carol would be an opportunity to achieve this. Upon rereading the story, he realized that "the story has never been realized in a way that it was actually imagined by Charles Dickens as he wrote it," as well as that "it's as if he wrote this story to be a movie because it's so visual and so cinematic." Zemeckis has stated previously that A Christmas Carol is one of his favorite stories dealing with time travel. Carrey has described the film as "a classical version of A Christmas Carol […] There are a lot of vocal things, a lot of physical things, I have to do. Not to mention doing the accents properly, the English, Irish accents […] I want it to fly in the UK. I want it to be good and I want them to go, 'Yeah, that's for real.' We were very true to the book. It's beautiful. It's an incredible film."

Disney partnered with Amtrak to promote the film with a special nationwide train tour, starting in May 2009 and visiting 40 cities, finishing in New York in November.

Release 
A Christmas Carol opened London on November 3, 2009, and was theatrically released on November 6, 2009, in the United States by Walt Disney Pictures.

Home media 
Disney released the film on November 23, 2010 in a single-disc DVD, two-disc 2D Blu-ray/DVD combo and in a four-disc combo pack that includes a Blu-ray 3D, a Blu-ray 2D, a DVD and a digital copy. This marked the first time that a film was available in Blu-ray 3D the same day as a standard Blu-ray 2D, as well as Disney's first in the Blu-ray 3D market along with Alice in Wonderland. The DVD contains deleted scenes and two featurettes called "On Set with Sammi" and "Capturing A Christmas Carol". The Blu-ray 2D also has a "Digital Advent Calendar" and the featurette "Behind the Carol: The Full Motion-Capture Experience". The Blu-ray 3D has an exclusive 3D game called "Mr. Scrooge's Wild Ride".

Reception

Box office 
A Christmas Carol grossed $137.9 million in the United States and Canada, and $187.4 million in other territories, for a worldwide total of $325.3 million. Due to its high production and marketing costs, the film lost the studio an estimated $50–100 million, and forced Mark Zoradi, president of Walt Disney Studios Motion Pictures Group and the head of worldwide marketing, to resign.

The film opened at #1 in 3,683 theaters, grossing $30.1 million its opening weekend, with an average of $8,159 per theater.

In the United Kingdom, A Christmas Carol topped the box office on two occasions; the first was when it opened, the second was five weeks later when it leapfrogged box office chart toppers 2012, The Twilight Saga: New Moon and Paranormal Activity despite family competition from Nativity!, another Christmas-themed film.

Critical response 
On review aggregator Rotten Tomatoes, 53% of 202 critics have given the film a positive review with an average rating of 6/10. The site's critical consensus read, "Robert Zemeckis' 3-D animated take on the Dickens classic tries hard, but its dazzling special effects distract from an array of fine performances from Jim Carrey and Gary Oldman." On Metacritic, another aggregator, the film has a weighted average score of 55 out of 100 based on 32 critics, indicating "mixed or average reviews". Audiences polled by CinemaScore gave the film an average grade of "B+" on an A+ to F scale.

Roger Ebert of the Chicago Sun-Times gave the film four stars out of four, calling it "an exhilarating visual experience". Owen Gleiberman of Entertainment Weekly gave the film an A, applauding the film as "a marvelous and touching yuletide toy of a movie". Joe Neumaier of the New York Daily News gave the film 3/5 stars and stated the film "is well-crafted but artless, detailed but lacking soul." Mary Elizabeth Williams of Salon.com gave the film a mixed review claiming the movie "is a triumph of something—but it's certainly not the Christmas spirit." Joe Morgenstern of The Wall Street Journal wrote in his review that the film's "tone is joyless, despite an extended passage of bizarre laughter, several dazzling flights of digital fancy, a succession of striking images and Jim Carrey's voicing of Scrooge plus half a dozen other roles." The Daily Telegraph reviewer Tim Robey wrote, "How much is gained by the half-real visual style for this story is open to question—the early scenes are laborious and never quite alive, and the explosion of jollity at the end lacks the virtue of being funny." Peter Bradshaw in The Guardian also criticized the technology: "The hi-tech sheen is impressive but in an unexciting way. I wanted to see real human faces convey real human emotions." Time Out London praised the film for sticking to Dickens' original dialogue but also questioned the technology by saying, "To an extent, this 'Christmas Carol' is a case of style—and stylisation—overwhelming substance."

Keith Uhlich of Time Out New York named A Christmas Carol the eighth-best film of 2009.

Awards and nominations

Music 

Track listing

The music was composed by Alan Silvestri and orchestrated by William Ross, Conrad Pope, Silvestri, and John Ashton Thomas. The entire score was conducted by Silvestri and performed by the Hollywood Studio Symphony alongside Page LA Studio Voices and London Voices. Much of the music was based on actual carols, including "God Rest You Merry, Gentlemen," "Deck the Halls," "O Come, All Ye Faithful," "Hark! The Herald Angels Sing" and "Joy to the World." The album was later issued physically through Intrada Records. The theme song, "God Bless Us Everyone," was written by Glen Ballard and Silverstri and performed by Italian classical crossover tenor Andrea Bocelli.

See also
 List of Christmas films
 List of ghost films
 Adaptations of A Christmas Carol

References

External links 

 
 
 
 
 
 
 
 

2009 films
2009 computer-animated films
2009 fantasy films
2009 3D films
2000s fantasy adventure films
2000s fantasy drama films
2000s children's fantasy films
2000s ghost films
2000s Christmas films
2000s children's animated films
2000s American animated films
2000s English-language films
American 3D films
American children's animated adventure films
American children's animated fantasy films
American Christmas films
American computer-animated films
American fantasy adventure films
American fantasy drama films
American ghost films
Films directed by Robert Zemeckis
Films with screenplays by Robert Zemeckis
Films scored by Alan Silvestri
Films set in London
Films based on A Christmas Carol
Animated Christmas films
Animated films based on novels
Animated films set in London
Christmas adventure films
IMAX films
Films using motion capture
Films set in 1843
Films about size change
Animated films about time travel
Films set in the Victorian era
American dark fantasy films
ImageMovers films
Walt Disney Pictures animated films
2009 drama films
Films produced by Robert Zemeckis